Spy Intervention is a 2020 American action comedy spy film directed by Drew Mylrea and written by Mark Famiglietti and Lane Garrison. The film stars Drew Van Acker, Poppy Delevingne and Blake Anderson.

The film was released on selected theaters, digital, and on demand, simultaneously on February 14, 2020.

Plot
The world's greatest spy decides to abandon his adventurous lifestyle for the woman of his dreams. But when a madman tries to secure a devastating weapon, he soon gives up his boring existence to save not only the world, but his listless marriage.

Cast
 Drew Van Acker as Corey Gage
 Poppy Delevingne as Pam Grayson
 Blake Anderson as Smuts 
 Natasha Bassett as Alexandria
 Brittany Furlan as Brianna Brown
 Brian Sacca as Bob
 Dave Sheridan as Rick
 Lane Garrison as Fred
 Max Silvestri as Doyle Egan

References

External links
 
 

2020 films
2020 action comedy films
American action comedy films
American spy comedy films
2020s English-language films
2020s spy comedy films
2020s American films
2020 directorial debut films